Senate district 27 – Prague 1 is a senatorial district of the Senate of the Czech Republic. It consists of Prague 1, Prague 7. The district is represented by Miroslava Němcová who was elected in 2020.

Senators

Election results

1996 election

1999 by-election

2002 election

2008 election

2014 election
The 2014 election was held as part of 2014 Czech Senate election. Václav Hampl was elected new Senator when he defeated incumbent senator Zdeněk Schwarz. Hampl was supported by KDU-ČSL while Schwarz was supported by ODS. Much attention was also given to Laura Janáčková who ran as a candidate of ANO 2011. Janáčková was originally considered one of the possible front-runners but her campaign suffered from controversies and scandals.

References

 
27
Prague 1
Elections in Prague